Friendship Mound (also known as Rocky Bluff) is a castellated mound located just north of the village of Friendship, Adams County, in the U.S. state of Wisconsin. Friendship Lake is also adjacent to the mound, across Wisconsin Highway 13.

References

Castellated mounds of Wisconsin
Hills of Wisconsin
Landforms of Adams County, Wisconsin